Nketia is a surname. Notable people with the surname include:

 Asiedu Nketia (born 1956), Ghanaian politician
 Augustine Nketia (born 1970), Ghanaian athlete
 Edward Osei-Nketia (born 2001), New Zealand sprinter
 Joseph Hanson Kwabena Nketia (1921–2019), Ghanaian ethnomusicologist and composer